Metatorbernite (or meta-torbernite) is a radioactive phosphate mineral, and is a dehydration pseudomorph of torbernite. Chemically, it is a copper uranyl phosphate and usually occurs in the form of green platy deposits. It can form by direct deposition from a supersaturated solution, which produces true crystalline metatorbernite, with a dark green colour, translucent diaphaneity, and vitreous lustre. However, more commonly, it is formed by the dehydration of torbernite, which causes internal stress and breakage within the crystal lattice, resulting in crystals composed of microscopic powder held together using electrostatic force, and having a lighter green colour, opaque diaphaneity, and a relatively dull lustre. As with torbernite, it is named after the Swedish chemist Torbern Bergman. It is especially closely associated with torbernite, but is also found amongside autunite, meta-autunite and uraninite.

References

Uranium minerals

Uranyl compounds
Copper(II) minerals
Phosphate minerals
Radioactive minerals
Tetragonal minerals
Minerals in space group 85
Uranium(VI) minerals